is a railway station in  Hamakita-ku, Hamamatsu,  Shizuoka Prefecture, Japan, operated by the private railway company, Enshū Railway.

Lines
Hamakita Station is a station on the  Enshū Railway Line and is 11.2 kilometers from the starting point of the line at Shin-Hamamatsu Station.

Station layout
The station has a single island platform, connected to a two-story station building. The station building has automated ticket machines, and automated turnstiles which accept the NicePass smart card, as well as ET Card, a magnetic card ticketing system. The station is attended.

Platforms

Adjacent stations

|-
!colspan=5|Enshū Railway

Station history
It was renamed  in April 1923. All freight operations were discontinued in 1973. The station was given its current name in 1977, when the station building was reconstructed into a two-story structure housing a small shopping center. This shopping center closed in 2003.

Passenger statistics
In fiscal 2017, the station was used by an average of 1,707 passengers daily (boarding passengers only).

Surrounding area
Yamaha Hamakita factory

See also
 List of railway stations in Japan

References

External links

 Enshū Railway official website

Railway stations in Japan opened in 1909
Railway stations in Shizuoka Prefecture
Railway stations in Hamamatsu
Stations of Enshū Railway